Giuseppe Miggiano (born October 16, 1938) is a Belgian painter and artist.

He was born at Tuglie, in southern Italy, and moved with his family to Charleroi in the aftermath of  World War II.

References

External links
 Official website

1938 births
Living people
People from the Province of Lecce
Belgian artists